David Crawford may refer to:

People:

David L. Crawford (1889–1974), American football and basketball coach
Dave Crawford (musician) (1943–1988), American musician, songwriter and record producer
David Crawford (astronomer) (born 1931), American astronomer, winner of the 2010 Clifford W. Holmes Award for popularizing astronomy
David Crawford (Australian footballer) (born 1983), Australian rules footballer
David Crawford (businessman), Australian non-executive director
David Crawford (colonel) (c. 1625–1710), member of the House of Burgesses and plantation owner in Virginia
David Crawford (diplomat) (1928–1981), British ambassador to Qatar and to Bahrain
David Crawford (footballer, born 1873) (1873–1937), Scottish international footballer for St Mirren and Rangers
David Crawford (footballer, born 1985), Scottish footballer for Partick Thistle
David Crawford (footballer, born 1992), Scottish footballer for Hibernian
David Crawford (historian) (1665–1726), Scottish Historiographer Royal
David Crawford, American actor who played David Robinson in the 1962 film To Kill a Mockingbird

Places:
David Crawford House, Newburgh, New York, USA, which houses a collection of historical artifacts from a shipping merchant